Sean Patrick Astin (né Duke; born February 25, 1971) is an American actor. His acting roles include Samwise Gamgee in The Lord of the Rings trilogy (2001–2003), Mikey Walsh in The Goonies (1985), Billy Tepper in "Toy Soldiers" (1991), Daniel Ruettiger in Rudy (1993), Doug Whitmore in 50 First Dates (2004), Bill in Click (2006), Lynn McGill in the fifth season of 24 (2006), Oso in Special Agent Oso (2009–2012), Raphael in Teenage Mutant Ninja Turtles (2012–2017), Bob Newby in the second and third seasons of Netflix's Stranger Things (2017; 2019), and Ed in No Good Nick (2019).

He is the son of actress Patty Duke and adopted by actor John Astin. He has received various recognitions including a Screen Actors Guild Award and two Young Artist Awards. Additionally, he was nominated for the Academy Award for Best Live Action Short Film in 1994 for the short film Kangaroo Court.

Early life 
Astin was born in Santa Monica, California, the son of actress Patty Duke (1946–2016) and Michael Tell (born 1950). However, at the time, it was erroneously reported that entertainer Desi Arnaz Jr. was his biological father. During that time, Duke also had a personal relationship with Michael Tell, a writer, music promoter, and publisher of the newspaper The Las Vegas Israelite. When Duke became pregnant, she was unsure whether Arnaz or Tell was the father, so Tell offered to marry her as a way out of the scandal. The marriage lasted only 13 days in 1970 and ended before Astin was born.

On August 5, 1972, Duke married actor John Astin, having been in a relationship with him for two years. When the wedding guests were invited to speak, 18-month-old Sean looked at John and cried, "Daddy!", to which the Episcopal priest performing the ceremony remarked, "Well, that about does it!" Astin subsequently adopted Sean. In 1973, Duke gave birth to Astin's brother Mackenzie Astin, who also became an actor. Duke and John Astin divorced in 1985. Duke married Mike Pearce in 1986, and they adopted a son, Kevin, in 1989.

When Astin was 14, Duke told him that Arnaz was his father, and the two developed a relationship. However, in his mid-20s, Astin met a relative of Michael Tell who suggested they were related. Sean set out to find the truth about his biological father, and underwent genetic tests which showed Tell was his biological father. Astin has maintained close relationships with all three, and saying: "Desi Arnaz Jr. loves me, and I love him. We are so close ... Science tells me ... that he's not my biological father. Science tells me that Mike Tell is." Astin considers John his father, as John was the one who raised him. Astin is also close to his stepfather, Mike Pearce, saying, "I can call any of them on the phone any time I want to. John, Desi, Mike, or Papa Mike ... my four dads."

Astin is of German and Irish ancestry through his mother and Austrian Jewish and Polish Jewish through his biological father. He attended Catholic school and later became a Protestant.

Astin attended the Crossroads High School for the Arts and undertook master classes at the Stella Adler Conservatory in Los Angeles. He graduated cum laude from UCLA with a B.A. in History and English (American literature and culture). An alumnus of Los Angeles Valley College, Astin served on the school's board of directors of the Patrons Association and the Arts Council.

Career

Early career 

Astin's first acting role was in a 1981 television movie titled Please Don't Hit Me, Mom, in which he played an 8-year-old child with an abusive mother (portrayed by his real-life mother Patty Duke). He made his film debut at the age of 13 as Mikey in The Goonies (1985).

After The Goonies, Astin appeared in several more films, including the Disney made-for-TV movie, The B.R.A.T. Patrol, opposite Nia Long, Tim Thomerson, and Brian Keith; Like Father Like Son (1987); White Water Summer with Kevin Bacon (1987), The War of the Roses (1989); the World War II film Memphis Belle (1990); Toy Soldiers (1991); Encino Man (1992); and the college football biopic Rudy (1993), about the life-changing struggles and rewards of the titular character, Daniel Ruettiger.

In 1994, Astin directed and co-produced (with his wife, Christine Astin) the short film Kangaroo Court, which received an Academy Award nomination for Best Live Action Short Film. Astin continued to appear in films throughout the 1990s, including the Showtime science fiction film Harrison Bergeron (1995), the Gulf War film Courage Under Fire (1996), and the Warren Beatty political satire Bulworth (1998).

The Lord of the Rings 
In the early 2000s, Astin played Samwise Gamgee in Peter Jackson's The Lord of the Rings film trilogy, consisting of The Fellowship of the Ring (2001), The Two Towers (2002), and The Return of the King (2003). Many awards were bestowed upon the trilogy, particularly its final installment, which earned eleven Academy Awards, including Best Picture. Astin received seven award nominations for his own performance, and won five, including the Saturn Award, the Sierra Award, the Seattle Film Critics Award, and the Utah Film Critics Award (all for Best Supporting Actor), and the Visual Effects Society Award for Outstanding Performance by a Male or Female in an Effects Film. The Return of the King cast as an ensemble received awards from the National Board of Review of Motion Pictures, the Screen Actors Guild, the Broadcast Film Critics Association, and received a Gold Derby Award.

Throughout the filming process, Astin became close friends with several cast members, and became particularly good friends with costar Elijah Wood. Astin's daughter, Alexandra, is in the closing scene of The Return of the King. She plays his onscreen daughter, Elanor Gamgee, who runs out to him as he returns from the Grey Havens.

While working on The Lord of the Rings, Astin persuaded a number of fellow cast and crew members, including director Peter Jackson, to assist him in making his second short film, The Long and Short of It. The film, which takes place on a street in Wellington, New Zealand, premiered at the 2003 Sundance Film Festival and can be found on the DVD for The Two Towers, along with a "making of" video.

In 2004, Astin released There and Back Again, a memoir (co-written with Joe Layden) of his film career with emphasis on his experiences during production of The Lord of the Rings trilogy. The title is derived from the title of J. R. R. Tolkien's novel The Hobbit, as well as the fictional book written by Bilbo Baggins in The Lord of the Rings.

After The Lord of the Rings 

Since The Lord of the Rings, Astin has continued to work in film and television. His film roles have included the Adam Sandler comedies 50 First Dates and Click. Astin played the role of Malibu High School principal Mike Matthews in the movie Smile.

In television, Astin guest-starred as Lynn McGill throughout the fifth season of the Fox drama 24. He also appeared in the made-for-TV films Hercules and The Colour of Magic and in episodes of Monk, Las Vegas, My Name is Earl (in which he parodied his 1993 film Rudy with co-stars Charles S. Dutton and Chelcie Ross), and Law & Order, among other shows. He directed a 2003 episode of the TV series Angel, titled "Soulless". He played the enigmatic Mr. Smith on the second season of the Showtime series Jeremiah.

Astin's career has also expanded to include voice-over roles. He narrated the American version of the Animal Planet series Meerkat Manor, and voices the title character in Special Agent Oso which aired on Playhouse Disney from 2009 to 2011 and Disney Junior from 2011 to early 2014. His other voice work includes Balto III: Wings of Change, in which he voiced Kodi, a teenage husky who is the son of the titular character, and the video game Kingdom Hearts, in the latter of which he provided the voice of Hercules, replacing actor Tate Donovan, who was unavailable but would return for Kingdom Hearts II. Astin voiced Raphael in the Teenage Mutant Ninja Turtles animated series on Nickelodeon, which premiered on September 29, 2012, running for five seasons and 124 episodes, and ending on November 12, 2017.

In 2010, he joined the Stella Adler Los Angeles Theatre Collective acting company. Also as of 2010, Astin and his wife, Christine, were making a movie based on Lois Lowry's Newbery Medal-winning novel Number the Stars. They bought the film rights in 2008 and wrote a screenplay adaptation, with plans to direct and produce it themselves.

In March 2012, Astin played a cosmetic surgeon named Takin Mastuhmik in a fake movie trailer entitled Boobathon which appeared on Funny or Die. In March 2014, Astin played a soldier in Boys of Abu Ghraib, a military thriller inspired by the events that made worldwide news in 2004. In June of that year, he began playing the role of Jim Kent on the FX drama The Strain.

In October 2015, Astin played Hank Erwin in Woodlawn, a story about how a high school football team overcame racism and hate, and found unity and success through following Jesus.

In 2017, Astin played the role of Bob Newby in season two of the Netflix series Stranger Things. In 2019, Astin reprised the role of Newby in flashback scenes during the series' third season, played the role of Dr. Greg Pemberton on several episodes of The Big Bang Theory, and had a guest appearance on the fifth season of Supergirl. In 2019, he was in the Netflix dramedy No Good Nick in which he played Ed. Also in 2019, he appeared in the 6th season of Brooklyn Nine-Nine.

In May 2020, Astin joined Josh Gad's YouTube series Reunited Apart, which reunites the casts of popular movies through video-conferencing, and promotes donations to non-profit charities. Others in the episode were fellow The Lord of the Rings castmates Sean Bean, Orlando Bloom, Billy Boyd, Ian McKellen, Dominic Monaghan, Viggo Mortensen, Miranda Otto, John Rhys-Davies, Andy Serkis, Liv Tyler, Karl Urban, and Elijah Wood, plus writer Philippa Boyens and director Peter Jackson.

Personal life 
Astin married Christine Harrell on July 11, 1992. They have three daughters: Alexandra (born in November 1996), Elizabeth (born in August 2002), and Isabella (born in July 2005), all having the middle name Louise. His wife held the Miss Indiana Teen USA title in 1984. Alexandra had a small cameo role in The Lord of the Rings: The Return of the King as Elanor Gamgee, Astin's character's daughter, and appears in Bad Kids of Crestview Academy as Ethel Balducci.

Astin has a tattoo on his ankle of the word "nine" written with the Tengwar script, commemorating his Lord of the Rings involvement and his character's membership in the "Fellowship of the Ring". Seven of the eight other actors (Elijah Wood, Sean Bean, Billy Boyd, Ian McKellen, Dominic Monaghan, Viggo Mortensen and Orlando Bloom) all have the same tattoo. John Rhys-Davies' stunt double, Brett Beattie, has the tattoo as well.

In an August 2013 interview, Astin said he is a Lutheran Christian, having been "baptized in my wife's Lutheran church".

In January 2015, Astin completed the Dopey Challenge at the Walt Disney World Resort which involves running a 5k, 10k, half-marathon and full marathon on four consecutive days.

On October 10, 2015, Astin competed in the 2015 Ironman World Championship in Kailua Kona, Hawaii. Wearing number 143, Astin finished the race in a time of 15:30:31.

Political support 
From 1995 to 2005, Astin served as a Civilian Aide to the Secretary of the Army (CASA) and afterwards served on the President's Council on Service and Civic Participation for two years during the George W. Bush administration.

Astin is a lifelong supporter of the Democratic Party.

During the 2004 United States presidential election, Astin backed Senator John Kerry and participated in Kerry's campaign rally in Portland, Oregon, as the opening speaker.

In the 2008 presidential election, Astin lent his support to then-Senator Hillary Clinton for the first of her two Presidential campaigns and made multiple campaign appearances on her behalf, including joining Clinton's daughter Chelsea at some stops.

Astin served as the campaign manager for Democrat Dan Adler, a businessman friend in the entertainment industry, in California's 36th congressional district special election of 2011.

In the 2016 presidential election, Astin campaigned for Hillary Clinton in midwestern states such as Iowa, Nebraska and Wisconsin.

In a 2020 Twitter post, Astin voiced his support for Democratic nominee Joe Biden.

Filmography

Film

Television

Video games

Awards and nominations

References

Further reading

External links 

 
 
 

1971 births
Living people
Jewish American male actors
American Ashkenazi Jews
American child models
American male child actors
American male film actors
American male television actors
American male video game actors
American male voice actors
American people of Austrian-Jewish descent
American people of German descent
American people of Irish descent
American people of Polish-Jewish descent
American Lutherans
Crossroads School alumni
Film producers from California
Film directors from Los Angeles
Los Angeles Valley College people
Male actors from Santa Monica, California
Outstanding Performance by a Cast in a Motion Picture Screen Actors Guild Award winners
University of California, Los Angeles alumni
20th-century American male actors
21st-century American male actors